ITA Award for Best Actress - Comedy is an award given by Indian Television Academy as a part of its annual event to a female actor in television series who has delivered an outstanding performance in a comic role.

Winners

References 

best actress comedy
Television awards for Best Actress